Everybody Makes Mistakes is Shearwater's second full-length album. It was released on October 1, 2002, on Misra Records.

Track listing 
"An Accident" (Jonathan Meiburg) – 2:31
"Well, Benjamin" (Will Sheff) – 3:15
"Soon" (Jonathan Meiburg) – 2:33
"Room for Mistakes" (Will Sheff) – 4:30
"12:09" (Jonathan Meiburg) – 3:25
"Mistakes" (Will Sheff) – 2:17
"The Ice Covered Everything" (Jonathan Meiburg) – 3:20
"You Took Your Mistakes Too Hard" (Jonathan Meiburg) – 1:48
"Wreck" (Will Sheff) – 3:13
"Safeway" (Will Sheff) – 3:40
"All the Black Days 1" (Jonathan Meiburg) – 1:22
"All the Black Days 2" (Jonathan Meiburg) – 4:23

References

External links
Misra Records
Official Shearwater site

2002 albums
Shearwater (band) albums